The Museum of Russian Icons is a non-profit art museum located in Clinton, Massachusetts, United States. The collection includes more than 1,000 Russian icons and related artifacts, making it one of the largest private collections of Russian icons outside of Russia and the largest in North America. The icons in the collection range in date from the 15th century through to the present and covers almost the entire range of Russian icon images, symbols, and forms.

History 

The Museum opened in October 2006. It began as the private collection of Gordon B. Lankton, a plastics engineer and former chairman and CEO of Nypro, Inc., a precision injection molding company now owned by Jabil Circuit. Lankton had been an avid traveler since he was stationed in Germany when he was in the Army. As outlined in his book The Long Way Home, Lankton took a motorcycle trip around the world in 1956 and 1957, visiting, in chronological order, Germany, Austria, Italy, Yugoslavia, Greece, Turkey, Syria, Iraq, Iran, Pakistan, India, Ceylon, Nepal, Burma, Thailand, Laos, Vietnam, Cambodia, Malaysia, Singapore, Indonesia, Philippines, Hong Kong, and Japan. According to Lankton, he had wanted to visit Russia but was not allowed to do so during the Cold War. In 1989, Lankton first traveled to Russia to open a Nypro factory there. On that visit, after learning more about icons, Lankton began his collection, starting with a small, poor quality icon he found at a flea market in the Izmaylovo District of Moscow.

Over the following 30 years, Lankton amassed several hundred icons. He displayed them at his home, at Nypro in a small gallery, and occasionally on loan to other museums, including the Higgins Armory Museum. As the collection grew and response to the informal sharing of his collection proved positive, Lankton decided to open his own museum directly across the street from Nypro. The Museum was incorporated in 2004, and Lankton purchased the building in early 2006. It opened to the public on October 15, 2006. Since then, two major expansion projects have taken place: in 2008, a research library and the South Gallery were added. In 2010, Lankton purchased the building immediately next door to the Museum and undertook a construction project to seamlessly join the two structures. The first phase of this project included the West Gallery and an expanded museum shop; the second phase included an expanded lower level with the Tea Room and auditorium.

Building 
Both buildings that now make up the single museum property were originally associated with the Bigelow Carpet Mill. The second building, previously 195 Union Street, also served at one time as both the Clinton District Court and the Police Station. Both buildings were completely renovated on the interiors by David Durrant of Durrant Designs. Some historical details were retained and renovated, including the jail cells that were once part of the police station; and the period window frames in the West Gallery. The building now has more than 16,000 square feet of gallery space on three floors.

Collection 

The Museum collection includes more than 1,000 Russian icons and related artifacts. The icons range in date from 1450 to the present day and are installed in thematic groupings rather than chronological order. The Museum is particularly proud to display extremely rare Royal Doors that once led to the High Altar of an Orthodox Church in Russia and can be traced back to the 17th century. The Royal Doors have recently been added to the Museum's collection and are considered to be the "finest pair in the United States."

Exhibitions 

The Museum organizes its own exhibitions from the permanent collection and also hosts visiting exhibitions from other museums and collections. In 2008 and 2010, respectively the Museum co-organized exhibitions of icons from the Tretyakov Gallery and the Andrei Rublev Museum of Early Russian Art and Culture. Because of an embargo of art loans from Russia to the U.S., ongoing since 2011, the Museum has relied on exhibitions originating in the United States.

Center for Icon Studies 

The Museum houses the Center for Icon Studies, the research arm of the institution that publishes the online Journal of Icon Studies. The journal is the only peer-reviewed publication exclusively devoted to Russian icons and related scholarship. Submissions to the journal are reviewed by members of the editorial board, which consists of twelve leading scholars in the field from the U.S., Europe, and Russia. The editorial board is composed of some of the leading researchers in the field of icon studies:

 Amy Singleton Adams, College of the Holy Cross
 Elena Boeck, DePaul University
 Robin Cormack, Cambridge University
 Michael Flier, Harvard University
 Nancy Patterson-Ševčenko, International Center of Medieval Art
 Sarah Pratt, University of Southern California
 Wendy Salmond, Editor, Chapman University
 Vera Shevzov, Smith College
 Engelina Smirnova, Moscow State Lomonosov University and Institute of Art Studies, Moscow
 Oksana Smirnova, Andrey Rublev Museum of Old Russian Culture and Art
 Raoul N. Smith, Northeastern University
 Oleg Tarasov, Russian Academy of Sciences

References

External links 
 Museum Website

Museums in Worcester County, Massachusetts
Art museums and galleries in Massachusetts
Museum of Russian Icons
Art museums established in 2006
Museum of Russian Icons
Museum of Russian Icons
Museum of Russian Icons
Buildings and structures in Clinton, Massachusetts